Agh Qeshlaq may refer to:
 Agh Qeshlaq, Khoda Afarin
 Agh Qeshlaq, Meyaneh